Rahmatabad (also Romanized as Raḩmatābād; also known as Ranmatābād) is a village in Kamin Rural District, in the Central District of Pasargad County, Fars Province, Iran. At the 2006 census, its population was 187, in 45 families.

References 

Populated places in Pasargad County